Melanella boscheineni is a species of sea snail, a marine gastropod mollusk in the family Eulimidae. The species is one of many species known to exist within the genus, Melanella. This species is mainly distributed throughout Antarctic waters.

Description 
The maximum recorded shell length is 5.2 mm.

Habitat 
Minimum recorded depth is 250 m. Maximum recorded depth is 305 m.

References

External links

boscheineni
Gastropods described in 2004